142 (one hundred [and] forty-two) is the natural number following 141 and preceding 143.

In mathematics
There are 142 connected functional graphs on four labeled vertices, 142 planar graphs with 6 unlabeled vertices, and 142 partial involutions on five elements.

See also
 The year AD 142 or 142 BC
 List of highways numbered 142

References

Integers